Rajadamnern Stadium, also spelled Ratchadamnoen, is a sporting arena in Bangkok, Thailand. Along with Lumpinee Boxing Stadium, Rajadamnern is one of the two main stadiums for modern muay Thai. It hosts fights every Monday, Wednesday, Thursday and Sunday. The stadium has its own ranking system and championship titles up to middleweight (160 lbs).

History

In 1941, the prime minister of Thailand, Field Marshal Plaek Phibunsongkhram, gave orders to build a national boxing stadium on Rajadamnern Avenue. Impresse Italiane All' Estero-Oriente won the construction rights, and the 258,900 baht project foundation stone was laid on 1 March 1941.

Due to the lack of construction supplies during the World War II, the project was halted until August 1945. When construction resumed, it took only four months to complete it. The first boxing match was held on 23 December 1945. Tickets were priced at between 70 and 300 baht. Pramote Puengsoonthorn became the first stadium manager and remained in the post until his retirement in 1947.

The original stadium was open-air, resembling a Roman amphitheatre in design. Six years later, in 1951 a concrete roof was added, making it weather-proof. After seven years of government ownership, the stadium was losing money, and on 24 May 1953, Chalerm Cheosakul, the stadium manager at the time, asked permission from the Crown Property Bureau to run the stadium and founded the "Rajadamnern Co, Ltd." Rajadamnern Co., Ltd. operates it to this day, and it has become one of the chief muay Thai boxing stadiums in Thailand.

Chuwattana Muay Thai & Boxing camp is the official promoter for Rajadamnern Stadium, licensed by the Thailand Boxing Commission.

As part of Rajadamnern World Series, on 22 July 2022, Rajadamnern Stadium hosted the first four female Muay Thai fights in its almost eight decade-long history. The first female bout was between Aida Looksaikongdin and Zahra Shokouhi.

Gambling
Gambling is legal and takes place at the second level. The betting is done by hand-signals, as on a stock exchange trading floor. Often such signs are misunderstood by one side and fights may erupt outside the ring between gamblers. The security service at Rajadamnern Stadium is managed by armed military police. Foreigners usually occupy the expensive ringside seats, while gamblers and aficionados prefer the second or third ring of seats upstairs.

Current champions

See also
 Lumpinee Stadium
 World Muaythai Council

References

External links
 Rajadamnern Stadium Rankings

Indoor arenas in Thailand
Kickboxing in Thailand
Professional Muay Thai organizations
Sports venues in Bangkok
Boxing venues in Thailand
Pom Prap Sattru Phai district
Sports venues completed in 1945
Muay Thai venues in Thailand
Muay Thai venues in Bangkok